Pagan Yazawin (also known as Pagan Yazawin Haung is a 16th-century Burmese chronicle that covers the history of the Pagan Dynasty. One palm-leaf manuscript copy of the chronicle is stored at the Universities Historical Research Center in Yangon.

References

Bibliography
 
 

Burmese chronicles